Dompaire is a commune in the Vosges department in Grand Est in northeastern France. In September 1944 during World War II a detachment of General Philippe Leclerc's French  2nd Armoured Division engaged and defeated a German Panzer brigade causing significant losses.

See also
Communes of the Vosges department

References

Communes of Vosges (department)